Lasioglossum zonulus is a species of sweat bee in the family Halictidae. It is found in Europe and North America. While the name has historically been misspelled "zonulum" (e.g. ), the original name, zonulus, is a noun and does not change spelling under Article 31 of the ICZN, and some sources (e.g. ) have recognized this and adopted the correct spelling.

References

zonulus
Articles created by Qbugbot
Insects described in 1848